State Route 66 (SR 66) is a surface road in the U.S. state of Arizona in Mohave and Coconino Counties. In 1914, the road was designated "National Old Trails Highway" but in 1926 was re-designated as U.S. Route 66. In 1985, U.S. Route 66 was dropped from the highway system. Parts of the highway were either absorbed into I-40, turned over to the state (SR 66), or turned over to Yavapai County.

Route description
State Route 66 is a relic of the former U.S. Route 66 in Arizona and is the only part of old US 66 in Arizona to have state route markers.  Its western terminus is near Kingman at exit 52 on Interstate 40 and its eastern terminus was near Seligman at exit 123 on Interstate 40. In 1990, the state turned over the easternmost  of SR 66 (known as Crookton Rd) to Yavapai County for maintenance.

State Route 66 tends downward toward the west, with the vegetation becoming more desert-like toward Kingman.  The terrain changes at a slower pace than the more direct Interstate 40, making it a scenic alternative at the cost of some time. It still serves communities that the freeway avoids, including Valentine and Peach Springs; it enters the Hualapai Indian Reservation.

History

U.S. Route 66 in Arizona

Between the California state line and Kingman, the original alignment is now known as Oatman Road and passed through the old mining town of Oatman. A later alignment (via Yucca) is now Interstate 40. The older alignment passes through the Black Mountains complete with numerous hairpin turns. This area is desert.

From Kingman to Seligman, it took a path now followed by modern State Route 66.

East of Seligman and continuing beyond Flagstaff, the area is mountainous (not desert) and covered with pine forests. Continuing toward the New Mexico state line, much of US 66 has been replaced with I-40. Various stretches of the old highway exist as frontage roads and business loops of I-40.

State route
In 1984, US 66 was officially removed from the state highway system of Arizona.  Most of the old highway had been replaced by I-40, but the portion between Kingman and Seligman where I-40 followed a new alignment to the south became SR 66.  In 1990, the state turned over the easternmost  of SR 66 (known as Crookton Rd) to Yavapai County for maintenance.

Junction list

References

Further reading

External links

 SR 66 at Arizona Roads

066
U.S. Route 66 in Arizona
Transportation in Mohave County, Arizona
Transportation in Coconino County, Arizona
Transportation in Yavapai County, Arizona
Kingman, Arizona